Kareem Olasunkanmi Temitayo (born 31 March 1994), professionally known as Magicsticks also known for the tag Tune into the King of Sounds and Blues, is a Nigerian record producer, sound engineer and disc jockey. He made his mainstream debut when he produced DJ Neptune's "Nobody" featuring Mr Eazi and Joeboy in 2020, and popular for producing all 12 track records on Asake Mr. Money with the Vibe album, which album debut at number 66 on Billboard's 200 charts and top albums chart in 31 countries worldwide, making it the biggest debut for an Afrobeats album.

Life 
Magicsticks was born in Lagos, Nigeria and attended Lagos State Polytechnic. After embracing music thanks to his father, who was a professional DJ, he first followed his path as a DJ before turning to music producing on a full-time basis.

He first rose to prominence with his works on Kizz Daniel's 2018 album No Bad Songz, before producing DJ Neptune's 2020 hit "Nobody", featuring Mr Eazi and Joeboy. At the start of 2022, he formed a successful artist-producer combo with the Nigerian singer-songwriter Asake, as he went on producing, mixing and mastering process both of his debut EP, Ololade, and his debut album, Mr. Money with the Vibe.

Magicsticks has produced Nigerian music for the likes of Young John, Niniola, Olamide, Lil Kesh and Mr Eazi and tip to be the 2022 Nigerian producer of the year according to Pulse Nigeria.

Production discography

Singles produced

References 

Living people
Nigerian hip hop record producers
Nigerian songwriters
1995 births